Banki is a town, a nagar panchayat and a block panchayat in Barabanki district  in the state of Uttar Pradesh, India.

Demographics
As of the 2001 Census of India, Banki had a population of 16,997. Males constitute 57% of the population and females 43%. Banki has an average literacy rate of 58%, lower than the national average of 59.5%; with 64% of the males and 36% of females literate. 15% of the population is under 6 years of age.

Administration

Block Panchayat Banki 

Block panchayat Banki comes under tehsil Nawabganj. It has 75 gram panchayats.

References

Cities and towns in Barabanki district